

Events

Pre-1600
332 BC – Alexander the Great is crowned pharaoh of Egypt.

1601–1900
1680 – German astronomer Gottfried Kirch discovers the Great Comet of 1680, the first comet to be discovered by telescope.
1770 – James Bruce discovers what he believes to be the source of the Nile.
1812 – Napoleonic Wars: At the Battle of Smoliani, French Marshals Victor and Oudinot are defeated by the Russians under General Peter Wittgenstein. 
1851 – Moby-Dick, a novel by Herman Melville, is published in the USA.
1889 – Pioneering female journalist Nellie Bly (aka Elizabeth Cochrane) begins a successful attempt to travel around the world in less than 80 days. She completes the trip in 72 days.

1901–present
1910 – Aviator Eugene Burton Ely performs the first takeoff from a ship in Hampton Roads, Virginia, taking off from a makeshift deck on the USS Birmingham in a Curtiss pusher.
1914 – The Joensuu City Hall, designed by Eliel Saarinen, was inaugurated in Joensuu, Finland.
1918 – The Provisional National Assembly of the new republic of Czechoslovakia meets to devise a constitution.
1920 – Pesäpallo, the Finnish version of baseball developed by Lauri Pihkala, is played for the first time at Kaisaniemi Park in Helsinki.
1921 – The Communist Party of Spain is founded, and issues the first edition of Mundo obrero.
1922 – The British Broadcasting Company begins radio service in the United Kingdom.
1938 – The Lions Gate Bridge, connecting Vancouver to the North Shore region, opens to traffic.
1940 – World War II: In England, Coventry is heavily bombed by German Luftwaffe bombers. Coventry Cathedral is almost completely destroyed.
1941 – World War II: The aircraft carrier  sinks due to torpedo damage from the  sustained on November 13.
  1941   – World War II: German troops, aided by local auxiliaries, murder nine thousand residents of the Słonim Ghetto in a single day.
1952 – The New Musical Express publishes the first regular UK Singles Chart.
1957 – The "Apalachin meeting" in rural Tioga County in upstate New York is raided by law enforcement; many high-level Mafia figures are arrested while trying to flee. 
1960 – Ruby Bridges becomes the first Black child to attend an all-White elementary school in Louisiana.
1965 – Vietnam War: The Battle of Ia Drang begins: The first major engagement between regular American and North Vietnamese forces.
1967 – The Congress of Colombia, in commemoration of the 150th anniversary of the death of Policarpa Salavarrieta, declares this day as "Day of the Colombian Woman".
  1967   – American physicist Theodore Maiman is given a patent for his ruby laser systems, the world's first laser.
1969 – Apollo program: NASA launches Apollo 12, the second crewed mission to the surface of the Moon.
1970 – Soviet Union enters ICAO, making Russian the fourth official language of organization.
  1970   – Southern Airways Flight 932 crashes in the mountains near Huntington, West Virginia, killing 75, including almost all of the Marshall University football team.
1971 – Mariner 9 enters orbit around Mars.
1973 – In the United Kingdom, Princess Anne marries Captain Mark Phillips, in Westminster Abbey.
  1973   – The Athens Polytechnic uprising, a massive demonstration of popular rejection of the Greek military junta of 1967–74, begins.
1975 – With the signing of the Madrid Accords, Spain abandons Western Sahara.
1977 – During a British House of Commons debate, Labour MP Tam Dalyell poses what would become known as the West Lothian question, referring to issues related to devolution in the United Kingdom. 
1978 – France conducts the Aphrodite nuclear test as 25th in the group of 29 1975–78 French nuclear tests.
1979 – US President Jimmy Carter issues Executive Order 12170, freezing all Iranian assets in the United States in response to the hostage crisis.
1982 – Lech Wałęsa, the leader of Poland's outlawed Solidarity movement, is released after eleven months of internment near the Soviet border.
1984 – Zamboanga City mayor Cesar Climaco, a prominent critic of the government of Philippine President Ferdinand Marcos, is assassinated in his home city.
1990 – After German reunification, the Federal Republic of Germany and Poland sign a treaty confirming the Oder–Neisse line as the border between Germany and Poland.
1991 – American and British authorities announce indictments against two Libyan intelligence officials in connection with the downing of the Pan Am Flight 103.
  1991   – Cambodian Prince Norodom Sihanouk returns to Phnom Penh after thirteen years in exile.
1992 –  In poor conditions caused by Cyclone Forrest, Vietnam Airlines Flight 474 crashes near Nha Trang, killing 30.
1995 – A budget standoff between Democrats and Republicans in the U.S. Congress forces the federal government to temporarily close national parks and museums and to run most government offices with skeleton staffs.
2001 – War in Afghanistan: Afghan Northern Alliance fighters take over the capital Kabul.
  2001   – A magnitude 7.8 earthquake strikes a remote part of the Tibetan plateau. It has the longest known surface rupture recorded on land (~400 km) and is the best documented example of a supershear earthquake.
2003 – Astronomers discover 90377 Sedna, the most distant trans-Neptunian object.
2008 – The first G-20 economic summit opens in Washington, D.C.
2012 – Israel launches a major military operation in the Gaza Strip in response to an escalation of rocket attacks by Hamas.
2016 – A magnitude 7.8 earthquake strikes Kaikoura, New Zealand, at a depth of 15 km (9 miles), resulting in the deaths of two people.
2017 – A gunman kills four people and injures 12 others during a shooting spree across Rancho Tehama, California. He had earlier murdered his wife in their home.
2019 – A mass shooting occurs at Saugus High School in Santa Clarita, California, resulting in three deaths, including that of the perpetrator, and three injuries.

Births

Pre-1600
1449 – Sidonie of Poděbrady, daughter of King of Bohemia (d. 1510)
1487 – John III of Pernstein, Bohemian land-owner, Governor of Moravia and Count of Kladsko (d. 1548)
1501 – Anna of Oldenburg, Regent of East Frisia (d. 1575)
1531 – Richard Topcliffe, English torturer (d. 1604)

1601–1900
1601 – John Eudes, French priest and missionary (d. 1680)
1650 – William III of England, Prince of Orange, King of England, Scotland and Ireland (d. 1702)
1663 – Friedrich Wilhelm Zachow, German organist and composer (d. 1712)
1719 – Leopold Mozart, Austrian violinist, composer, and conductor (d. 1787)
1765 – Robert Fulton, American engineer, Early steamboat pioneer (d. 1815)
1771 – Marie François Xavier Bichat, French anatomist and physiologist (d. 1802)
1776 – Henri Dutrochet, French physician, botanist, and physiologist (d. 1847)
1777 – Nathaniel Claiborne, American farmer and politician (d. 1859)
1778 – Johann Nepomuk Hummel, Austrian pianist and composer (d. 1837)
1779 – Adam Oehlenschläger, Danish poet and playwright (d. 1850)
1797 – Charles Lyell, Scottish geologist (d. 1875)
1803 – Jacob Abbott, American author (d. 1879)
1805 – Fanny Mendelssohn, German pianist and composer (d. 1847)
1812 – Aleardo Aleardi, Italian poet (d. 1878)
  1812   – Maria Cristina of Savoy (d. 1836)
1816 – John Curwen, English minister and educator (d. 1880)
1828 – James B. McPherson, American general (d. 1864)
1832 – Henry Strangways, English-Australian politician, 12th Premier of South Australia (d. 1920)
1838 – August Šenoa, Croatian author, poet, and critic (d. 1881)
1840 – Claude Monet, French painter (d. 1926)
1856 – Madeleine Lemoyne Ellicott, American activist (d. 1945)
1861 – Frederick Jackson Turner, American historian and author (d. 1932)
1863 – Leo Baekeland, Belgian-American chemist and engineer (d. 1944)
1869 – John Lumsden, Irish physician, founded the St. John Ambulance Brigade of Ireland (d. 1944)
1871 – Wajed Ali Khan Panni, Bengali aristocrat and philanthropist (d. 1936)
1875 – Gregorio del Pilar, Filipino general and politician (d. 1899)
  1875   – Jakob Schaffner, Swiss author and activist (d. 1944)
1877 – Norman Brookes, Australian tennis player (d. 1968)
1878 – Julie Manet, French painter and art collector (d. 1966)
  1878   – Leopold Staff, Ukrainian-Polish poet and academic (d. 1957)
1883 – Ado Birk, Estonian lawyer and politician, 3rd Prime Minister of Estonia (d. 1942)
1889 – Jawaharlal Nehru, Indian lawyer and politician, 1st Prime Minister of India (d. 1964)
1891 – Frederick Banting, Canadian physician and academic, Nobel Prize laureate (d. 1941)
1895 – Walter Jackson Freeman II, American physician and psychiatrist (d. 1972)
1897 – John Steuart Curry, American painter and academic (d. 1946)
1898 – Benjamin Fondane, Romanian-French philosopher, poet, and critic (d. 1944)
1900 – Aaron Copland, American composer, conductor, and educator (d. 1990)

1901–present
1904 – Harold Haley, American lawyer and judge (d. 1970)
  1904   – Harold Larwood, English-Australian cricketer (d. 1995)
  1904   – Dick Powell, American actor, singer, director, and producer (d. 1963)
1905 – John Henry Barbee, American singer and guitarist (d. 1964)
1906 – Louise Brooks, American actress and dancer (d. 1985)
1907 – Howard W. Hunter, American religious leader, 14th President of The Church of Jesus Christ of Latter-day Saints (d. 1995)
  1907   – Astrid Lindgren, Swedish author and screenwriter (d. 2002)
  1907   – William Steig, American author, illustrator, and sculptor (d. 2003)
1908 – Joseph McCarthy, American captain, lawyer, and politician (d. 1957)
1910 – Rosemary DeCamp, American actress and singer (d. 2001)
  1910   – Eric Malpass, English author (d. 1996)
1912 – Barbara Hutton, American philanthropist (d. 1979)
  1912   – Tung-Yen Lin, Chinese-American engineer, designed the Guandu Bridge (d. 2003)
1914 – Ken Carson, American Western singer (d. 1994)
1915 – Mabel Fairbanks, American figure skater and coach (d. 2001)
  1915   – Martha Tilton, American singer and actress (d. 2006)
1916 – Roger Apéry, Greek-French mathematician and academic (d. 1994)
  1916   – Sherwood Schwartz, American screenwriter and producer (d. 2011)
1917 – Park Chung-hee, South Korean general and politician, 3rd President of South Korea (d. 1979)
1918 – John Bromwich, Australian tennis player (d. 1999)
1919 – Johnny Desmond, American singer (d. 1985)
  1919   – Lisa Otto, German soprano and actress (d. 2013)
1920 – Mary Greyeyes, the first First Nations woman to join the Canadian Armed Forces (d. 2011)
1921 – Ea Jansen, Estonian historian and academic (d. 2005)
  1921   – Brian Keith, American actor and director (d. 1997)
1922 – Boutros Boutros-Ghali, Egyptian politician and diplomat, 6th Secretary General of the United Nations (d. 2016)
  1922   – Veronica Lake, American actress and singer (d. 1973)
1924 – Leonid Kogan, Ukrainian-Russian violinist and educator (d. 1982)
1925 – Stirling Colgate, American physicist and academic (d. 2013)
  1925   – James Mellaart, English archaeologist and author (d. 2012)
1927 – Lawrie Barratt, English businessman, founded Barratt Developments (d. 2012)
  1927   – Bart Cummings, Australian horse trainer (d. 2015)
  1927   – McLean Stevenson, American actor and screenwriter (d. 1996)
  1927   – Narciso Yepes, Spanish guitarist and composer (d. 1997)
1928 – Kathleen Hughes, American actress 
1929 – Shirley Crabtree, English wrestler (d. 1997)
  1929   – Jimmy Piersall, American baseball player and sportscaster (d. 2017)
1930 – Peter Katin, English pianist and academic (d. 2015)
  1930   – Monique Mercure, Canadian actress (d. 2020)
  1930   – Michael Robbins, English actor (d. 1992)
  1930   – Ed White, American engineer and astronaut (d. 1967)
1932 – Gunter Sachs, German astrologer and photographer (d. 2011)
1933 – Fred Haise, American pilot, engineer, and astronaut
1934 – Dave Mackay, Scottish-English footballer and manager (d. 2015)
  1934   – Ellis Marsalis, Jr., American pianist and educator (d. 2020)
  1934   – Catherine McGuinness, Irish lawyer, judge, and politician
1935 – Michael Busselle, English photographer and author (d. 2006)
  1935   – Hussein of Jordan (d. 1999)
  1935   – Lefteris Papadopoulos, Greek songwriter and journalist
1936 – Carey Bell, American singer and harmonica player (d. 2007)
  1936   – Freddie Garrity, English singer and actor (d. 2006)
  1936   – Cornell Gunter, American R&B singer (d. 1990)
1937 – Alan J. W. Bell, English director and producer
  1937   – Murray Oliver, Canadian ice hockey player and coach (d. 2014)
1939 – Wendy Carlos, American keyboard player and composer
1942 – Manon Cleary, American painter and academic (d. 2011)
  1942   – Natalia Gutman, Russian cellist and educator
1943 – Peter Norton, American programmer and author
1944 – Karen Armstrong, English author and academic
  1944   – David Nash, English sculptor and academic
  1944   – Mike Katz, American bodybuilder and football player
1945 – Louise Ellman, English academic and politician
  1945   – Vikram Gokhale, Indian actor and director (d. 2022)
  1945   – Brett Lunger, American race car driver
  1945   – Sue Williams, American actress and model (d. 1969)
1946 – Bharathan, Indian director and screenwriter (d. 1998)
  1946   – Roland Duchâtelet, Belgian businessman and politician
1947 – P. J. O'Rourke, American political satirist and journalist (d. 2022)
  1947   – Nat Young, Australian surfer and author
  1947   – Buckwheat Zydeco, American accordion player (d. 2016)
1948 – Paul Dacre, English journalist
  1948   – Michael Dobbs, English author and politician
  1948   – Robert Ginty, American actor and producer (d. 2009)
  1948   – Charles III, King of the United Kingdom
1949 – Raúl di Blasio, Argentinian pianist, composer, and producer
  1949   – Enzo Cucchi, Italian painter
  1949   – Gary Grubbs, American actor
  1949   – Ryo Hayami, Japanese actor
  1949   – James Young, American singer-songwriter and guitarist 
1951 – Leszek Cichy, Polish mountaineer
  1951   – Zhang Yimou, Chinese actor, director, producer, and cinematographer
1952 – Dimitra Galani, Greek singer, composer and songwriter
  1952   – Johnny A., American guitarist and songwriter
  1952   – Maggie Roswell, American voice actress and singer
1953 – Tim Bowler, English children's author
  1953   – Dominique de Villepin, Moroccan-French lawyer and politician, 167th Prime Minister of France
1954 – Willie Hernandez, Puerto Rican baseball player 
  1954   – Bernard Hinault, French cyclist
  1954   – Condoleezza Rice, American political scientist, academic, and politician, 66th United States Secretary of State
  1954   – Eliseo Salazar, Chilean race car driver
  1954   – Yanni, Greek-American pianist, composer, and producer 
1955 – Philip Egan, English bishop
  1955   – Jack Sikma, American basketball player and coach
1956 – Babette Babich, American philosopher, author, and scholar
  1956   – Avi Cohen, Israeli footballer and manager (d. 2010)
  1956   – Peter R. de Vries, Dutch investigative journalist and crime reporter (d. 2021)
  1956   – Steve Stockman, American accountant and politician
  1956   – Valerie Jarrett, American government official
1957 – Donald Canfield, American geologist and academic
  1957   – Michael J. Fitzgerald, American author
1959 – Paul Attanasio, American screenwriter and producer
  1959   – Paul McGann, English actor
  1959   – Chris Woods, English footballer, coach, and manager
1960 – Tom Judson, American actor and composer
  1960   – Remi Moses, English footballer and coach
1961 – Antonio Flores, Spanish singer-songwriter and actor (d. 1995)
  1961   – D. B. Sweeney, American actor
1962 – Laura San Giacomo, American actress
  1962   – Josh Silver, American keyboard player and producer
  1962   – Harland Williams, Canadian-American actor and screenwriter
  1963   – Stéphane Bern, French journalist, radio and television presenter
1964 – Bill Hemmer, American journalist
  1964   – Joseph Simmons, American hip-hop artist
  1964   – Patrick Warburton, American actor and comedian
1966 – Charles Hazlewood, English conductor
  1966   – Petra Rossner, German cyclist
  1966   – Curt Schilling, American baseball player and sportscaster
1967 – Letitia Dean, English actress and singer
  1967   – Nina Gordon, American singer-songwriter 
  1967   – Leo Kunnas, Estonian colonel and author
1969 – Butch Walker, American singer-songwriter, guitarist, and producer 
1970 – Brendan Benson, American singer-songwriter and guitarist 
  1970   – David Wesley, American basketball player and sportscaster
1971 – Adam Gilchrist, Australian cricketer and sportscaster
  1971   – Vikas Khanna, Indian chef and author
  1971   – Marco Leonardi, Australian-Italian actor
1972 – Matt Bloom, American wrestler, trainer, and sportscaster
  1972   – Josh Duhamel, American model and actor
  1972   – Lara Giddings, Papua New Guinean-Australian politician, 44th Premier of Tasmania
  1972   – Edyta Górniak, Polish singer
  1972   – Dougie Payne, Scottish bass player
  1972   – Martin Pike, Australian footballer and coach
  1972   – Aaron Taylor, American football player and sportscaster
  1972   – Dariusz Żuraw, Polish footballer and manager
1973 – Lawyer Milloy, American football player
1974 – Adina Howard, American singer-songwriter and chef
  1974   – David Moscow, American actor 
  1974   – Joe Principe, American singer and bass player 
1975 – Travis Barker, American drummer, songwriter, and producer 
  1975   – Luiz Bombonato Goulart, Brazilian footballer
  1975   – Stephen Guarino, American actor
  1975   – Gary Vaynerchuk, Russian-American businessman and critic
1977 – Obie Trice, American rapper and producer
1978 – Bobby Allen, American ice hockey player
  1978   – Michala Banas, New Zealand actress and singer
  1978   – Delphine Chanéac, French model and actress
  1978   – Xavier Nady, American baseball player and coach
1979 – Carl Hayman, New Zealand rugby player
  1979   – Mavie Hörbiger, German-Austrian actress
  1979   – Olga Kurylenko, Ukrainian-French model and actress
  1979   – Pushkar Lele, Indian singer
  1979   – Moitheri Ntobo, Lesothan footballer
  1979   – Miguel Sabah, Mexican footballer
1980 – Brock Pierce, American actor and businessman
  1980   – Brooke Satchwell, Australian model and actress
1981 – Vanessa Bayer, American actress
  1981   – Tom Ferrier, English race car driver
  1981   – Russell Tovey, English actor
1982 – Boosie Badazz, American rapper
  1982   – Hamdan bin Mohammed Al Maktoum, Crown Prince of Dubai
  1982   – Kyle Orton, American football player
  1982   – Joy Williams, American singer-songwriter
1983 – Guillermo Moscoso, American baseball player
  1983   – Naqqash Tahir, English cricketer
  1983   – Chelsea Wolfe, American singer-songwriter
1984 – Lisa De Vanna, Australian footballer
  1984   – Courtney Johns, Australian footballer
  1984   – Marija Šerifović, Serbian singer
1985 – Thomas Vermaelen, Belgian footballer
1987 – Giorgos Georgiadis, Greek footballer
1988 – Chiyotairyū Hidemasa, Japanese sumo wrestler
  1988   – Nanase Hoshii, Japanese singer and actress
1989 – Vlad Chiricheș, Romanian footballer
  1989   – Jake Livermore, English footballer
1990 – Roman Bürki, Swiss footballer
  1990   – Jessica Jacobs, Australian actress and singer (d. 2008)
1991 – Miriam Brouwer, Canadian cyclist
  1991   – Taylor Hall, Canadian ice hockey player
  1991   – Graham Patrick Martin, American actor
1993 – Francisco Lindor, Puerto Rican baseball player
  1993   – Shūhei Nomura, Japanese actor
  1993   – Samuel Umtiti, French footballer
1996 – Borna Ćorić, Croatian tennis player
1997 – Axel Tuanzebe, English footballer
1998 – Sofia Kenin, American tennis player
  1998   – DeVonta Smith, American football player

Deaths

Pre-1600
 565 – Justinian I, Byzantine emperor (b. 482)
 669 – Fujiwara no Kamatari, Japanese politician (b. 614)
 940 – Abu'l-Fadl al-Bal'ami, Samanid vizier
 976 – Taizu, Chinese emperor (b. 927)
1060 – Geoffrey II, count of Anjou
1189 – William de Mandeville, 3rd Earl of Essex
1226 – Frederick of Isenberg, German politician (b. 1193)
1263 – Alexander Nevsky, Russian saint (b. 1220)
1346 – Ostasio I da Polenta, Lord of Ravenna
1359 – Gregory Palamas, Greek archbishop and saint (b. 1296)
1391 – Nikola Tavelić, Croatian missionary and saint (b. 1340)
1442 – Yolande of Aragon, French noblewoman (b. 1384)
1522 – Anne of France, duchess of Bourbon (b. 1461)
1539 – Hugh Faringdon, English monk and abbot 
1556 – Giovanni della Casa, Italian archbishop and poet (b. 1504)

1601–1900
1633 – William Ames, English philosopher and academic (b. 1576)
1687 – Nell Gwyn, English mistress of Charles II of England (b. 1650)
1691 – Tosa Mitsuoki, Japanese painter (b. 1617)
1716 – Gottfried Leibniz, German mathematician and philosopher (b. 1646)
1734 – Louise de Kérouaille, duchess of Portsmouth (b. 1649)
1739 – Juan de Galavís, Spanish Roman Catholic archbishop of Santo Domingo and Bogotá (b. 1683)
1746 – Georg Wilhelm Steller, German botanist, zoologist, physician, and explorer (b. 1709)
1749 – Maruyama Gondazaemon, Japanese sumo wrestler, the 3rd Yokozuna (b. 1713)
1817 – Policarpa Salavarrieta, Colombian seamstress and spy (b. 1795)
1825 – Jean Paul, German journalist and author (b. 1763)
1829 – Louis Nicolas Vauquelin, French pharmacist and chemist (b. 1763)
1831 – Georg Wilhelm Friedrich Hegel, German philosopher, author, and academic (b. 1770)
  1831   – Ignaz Pleyel, Austrian-French composer and piano builder (b. 1757)
1832 – Charles Carroll of Carrollton, American farmer and politician (b. 1737)
1844 – John Abercrombie, Scottish physician and philosopher (b. 1780)
  1844   – Flora Tristan, French author and activist (b. 1803)
1864 – Franz Müller, German tailor and murderer (b. 1840)
1866 – Miguel I of Portugal (b. 1802)

1901–present
1907 – Andrew Inglis Clark, Australian lawyer, judge, and politician (b. 1848)
1908 – Guangxu Emperor of China (b. 1871)
1910 – John La Farge, American artist (b. 1835)
1914 – Vengayil Kunhiraman Nayanar, Indian lawyer and journalist (b. 1861)
1915 – Booker T. Washington, American educator, essayist and historian (b. 1856)
1916 – Henry George, Jr., American journalist and politician (b. 1862)
  1916   – Saki, British short story writer (b. 1870)
1921 – Isabel, Princess Imperial of Brazil (b. 1846)
1930 – Sandy Pearce, Australian rugby league player (b. 1883)
1932 – Charles Hylton Stewart, English organist and composer (b. 1884)
1937 – Jack O'Connor, American baseball player and manager (b. 1866)
1944 – Carl Flesch, Hungarian violinist and educator (b. 1873)
  1944   – Trafford Leigh-Mallory, English air marshal (b. 1892)
1946 – Manuel de Falla, Spanish pianist and composer (b. 1876)
1947 – Joseph Allard, Canadian fiddler and composer (b. 1873)
1966 – Peter Baker, English captain, author, and politician (b. 1921)
1972 – Martin Dies, Jr., American lawyer and politician (b. 1900)
1974 – Johnny Mack Brown, American football player, actor, and singer (b. 1904)
1977 – A. C. Bhaktivedanta Swami Prabhupada, Indian monk and guru, founded the International Society for Krishna Consciousness (b. 1896)
1981 – Robert Bradford, Irish footballer and politician (b. 1941)
1984 – Cesar Climaco, Filipino lawyer and politician, 10th Mayor of Zamboanga City (b. 1916)
  1984   – Nikitas Platis, Greek actor and cinematographer (b. 1912)
1988 – Haywood S. Hansell, American general (b. 1903)
1989 – Jimmy Murphy, Welsh footballer, manager, assistant manager, coach and scout (b. 1910)
1990 – Sol Kaplan, American composer and conductor (b. 1919)
1991 – Tony Richardson, English-American director, producer, and screenwriter (b. 1928)
1992 – Ernst Happel, Austrian footballer and coach (b. 1925)
1994 – Tom Villard, American actor (b. 1953)
1995 – Jack Finney, American author and screenwriter (b. 1911)
1996 – Joseph Bernardin, American cardinal (b. 1928)
  1996   – John A. Cade, American soldier and politician (b. 1929)
1997 – Eddie Arcaro, American jockey and sportscaster (b. 1916)
  1997   – Jack Pickersgill, Canadian educator and politician, 35th Secretary of State for Canada (b. 1905)
2000 – Robert Trout, American journalist (b. 1908)
2001 – Charlotte Coleman, English actress (b. 1968)
  2001   – Juan Carlos Lorenzo, Argentinian footballer and manager (b. 1922)
2002 – Eddie Bracken, American actor (b. 1915)
  2002   – Elena Nikolaidi, Turkish-American soprano and educator (b. 1909)
2003 – Gene Anthony Ray, American actor, singer, dancer, and choreographer (b. 1962)
2004 – Michel Colombier, French-American composer and conductor (b. 1939)
2006 – Sumner Shapiro, American admiral (b. 1926)
2008 – Kristin Hunter, American author and academic (b. 1931)
  2008   – Robert E. Valett, American psychologist, teacher, and author (b. 1927)
2010 – Wes Santee, American runner (b. 1932)
2011 – Esin Afşar, Italian-Turkish singer and actress (b. 1936)
  2011   – Neil Heywood, English-Chinese businessman (b. 1970)
  2011   – Jackie Leven, Scottish singer-songwriter and guitarist (b. 1950)
2012 – Alexandro Alves do Nascimento, Brazilian footballer (b. 1974)
  2012   – Brian Davies, Australian rugby player and manager (b. 1930)
  2012   – Martin Fay, Irish fiddler (b. 1936)
  2012   – Ahmed Jabari, Palestinian commander (b. 1960)
  2012   – Abubakar Olusola Saraki, Nigerian physician and politician (b. 1933)
2013 – Sudhir Bhat, Indian producer and manager (b. 1951)
  2013   – Hari Krishna Devsare, Indian journalist and author (b. 1938)
  2013   – Bennett Masinga, South African footballer (b. 1965)
2014 – Eugene Dynkin, Russian-American mathematician and theorist (b. 1924)
  2014   – Glen A. Larson, American director, producer, and screenwriter, created Battlestar Galactica (b. 1937)
  2014   – Morteza Pashaei, Iranian singer-songwriter (b. 1984)
2015 – K. S. Gopalakrishnan, Indian director, producer, and screenwriter (b. 1929)
  2015   – Warren Mitchell, English actor and screenwriter (b. 1926)
2016 – Gwen Ifill, American television journalist (b. 1955)
2020 – Peter Florjancic, Slovene inventor and Olympic athlete (b. 1919)
  2020   – Des O'Connor, English comedian, singer and television presenter (b. 1932)

Holidays and observances
Anniversary of the Movement of Readjustment (Guinea-Bissau)
Children's Day, celebrated on the birthday of Jawaharlal Nehru (previously on November 20). (India)
Christian feast day:
Alberic of Utrecht
All Saints of the Carmelites
All Souls of the Benedictine family
Barlaam of Kiev (Eastern Orthodox Church)
Dubricius (Dyfrig, or Devereux)
Hypatius of Gangra
Joseph Pignatelli SJ
Justinian I (Eastern Orthodox and Lutheran Church)
Laurence O'Toole
Nikola Tavelic
Philip the Apostle (Eastern Orthodox Church)
Samuel Seabury (Anglican Communion)
Serapion of Algiers
Sidonius (Saëns)
Venera (Veneranda)
November 14 (Eastern Orthodox liturgics)
Day of the Colombian Woman (Colombia)
Mobile Brigade Day (Indonesia)
World Diabetes Day (International)
Dobruja Day (Romania)

References

External links

 
 
 

Days of the year
November